

Preseason Poll

Preseason poll at AmericaEast.com

Awards

Conference Preseason Team

Preseason All-Conference at AmericaEast.com

Weekly Awards

All-Conference Teams

All-Defensive Team

All-Freshmen Team

All-Academic Team

Player of the Year
Darryl Partin of Boston University was awarded Player of the Year honors in the 2011-2012 season.

Coach of the Year
Steve Pikiell of Stony Brook was awarded Coach of the Year honors in the 2011-2012 season.

Freshmen of the Year
Four McGlynn of Vermont was awarded Freshmen of the Year honors in the 2011-2012 season.

Defensive Player of the Year
Tommy Brenton of Stony Brook was awarded Defensive Player of the Year honors in the 2011-2012 season.

Scholar Athlete
Logan Aronhalt of Stony Brook was awarded Scholar Athlete honors in the 2011-2012 season.

See also
America East Conference
2013 America East men's basketball tournament